Charlottetown Mall was a shopping mall located in Charlotte, North Carolina, right outside what is now Charlotte center city. The first enclosed shopping mall in the Southeast, it opened in on October 28, 1959. Atlanta's Lenox Square opened two months earlier, but it was an open-air mall at first. The mall was situated on a  parcel on the southeastern fringes of Charlotte's "center city" area. Rouse Company was the mall's developers.

Stores and design
The  center featured one anchor store: Bon Marché, an Asheville, North Carolina-based department store with no connection to the Seattle-based retailer of the same name. Other major tenants included Colonial Stores supermarket, Rose's five and dime, Eckerd Drug and Milton's, a posh Ivy League haberdasher.  The mall was mostly one-story, although the "Central Mall" (middle of the mall) featured a second level with an auditorium and an S&W Cafeteria. The "Central Mall" also featured a fountain, bird cages, and tropical foliage.

Logo and Advertising 
Charlottetown Mall had a distinctive crown logo that was on all of its public trash cans and on the door handles at all the entrances/exits. This logo was designed by Dorr M. Depew, owner/operator of Depew Advertising, the Charlotte firm that provided graphic and advertising support for the new mall.  Depew also wrote and produced radio commercials for the new mall, using Edwin Franko Goldman's well-known concert march "On The Mall" as the musical background.

Fate
By 1964, Bon Marché had closed at the mall; their store was quickly replaced by Ivey's. Two other malls which opened in Charlotte - SouthPark Mall and Eastland Mall (in 1970 and 1975, respectively) soon grew to draw business away from Charlottetown Mall, causing the older, smaller mall to decline.

Charlottetown was first renovated in the 1980s, when it was converted into an outlet center (though several traditional stores were retained) and renamed "Outlet Square".  Ivey's converted its store to an outlet store before closing altogether. Eventually, the former Ivey's was taken over by Burlington Coat Factory.  The mall was renovated a second time in 1989 and renamed "Midtown Square," and two parking garages were added.  Unfortunately, neither of the renovations resuscitated the rapidly dying mall. The Colonial Stores was converted to a Big Star Markets, and later to Harris Teeter before closing in 1988.

After several years in dead mall status, Midtown Square closed. The mall and the cinemas - which also closed - were bulldozed in 2006. Currently, a mixed-use complex was built on the sites of the old cinema and shopping mall. The retail segment will include a two-story anchor store, with Home Depot Design Center on the first floor and Target on the second. In addition, the complex will feature  of additional retail, as well as condominiums, offices, and restaurants. The project, being developed in a joint venture by Charlotte-based Pappas Properties / Collette Associates and Birmingham-based Colonial Properties Trust, is scheduled to open in late 2007.

Currently

This site, now named Metropolitan, was subdivided into three blocks of development. The northernmost block is home to a Target and former Home Depot Design Center, which was replaced by a BJ's Wholesale Club. The southeastern block is a 10-story mixed-use building, which is home to a Trader Joe's, Best Buy and Zoës Kitchen on the first floor, with a Staples and a Marshall's on the third floor. NewDominion Bank, a regional bank, has its headquarters in the remaining floors above. The southwestern block is home to several restaurants, a West Elm, with 41 condos above the street level retail.

External links
 uptown magazine: Uptown Charlotte's intown neighborhoods
 Metropolitan, "Charlotte’s First Urban Mixed-Use Community"

Shopping malls in Charlotte, North Carolina
Shopping malls established in 1959